The fifth assembly of the Croatian Parliament was constituted on December 22, 2003 with mandates divided to 152 representatives after the November 23, 2003 elections.

Parliamentary officials

The president of the parliament (often also called the speaker in English) was Vladimir Šeks (HDZ).

Vice presidents of the parliament were:

 Luka Bebić (HDZ) 
 Darko Milinović (HDZ) 
 Đurđa Adlešić (HSLS) 
 Mato Arlović (SDP)
 Vesna Pusić (HNS)

The secretary was Josip Sesar.

Composition of the 5th Sabor
The following is the list parties represented in the 5th Sabor. Note that the Croatian law does not require candidates featured in party election lists to be members of the party, i.e. individuals can still run as independents on election lists submitted by political parties. Once elected, they are automatically considered members of that party's parliamentary caucus and normally vote together with the party even though they often continue to be formally independent.

Thus the table below includes data sorted by party caucuses. Apart from the three independents elected as representatives of various ethnic minorities (Jene Adam, Nikola Mak and Furio Radin), the December 2003 party figures also include seven other independents who were elected via party lists:
Croatian Democratic Peasant Party - 1 MP (Ivo Lončar) 
Croatian Party of Rights - 1 MP (Slaven Letica)  
Social Democratic Party - 5 MPs (Mirko Filipović, Ivo Josipović, Ljubo Jurčić, Vice Vukov)

MPs by party
This is a list of MPs elected to Sabor in the 2003 parliamentary election, sorted by party. Note this table is a record of the 2003 election results, it is not a record of the current status of the Sabor. The Changes table below records all changes in party affiliation.

Changes
Note that a number of MPs who are high-ranking members of parties in the ruling coalition were subsequently appointed to various ministerial and governmental positions, while others continued to serve as city mayors. In such cases they are required by Croatian law to put their parliamentary mandate on hiatus for the duration of their other term of office and in the meantime their seats are then taken by a party-appointed replacement MP. Those replacements are not documented here unless they resulted in a change in party balance.

External links
List of MPs on 28 October 2007 at Sabor.hr 

Lists of representatives in the modern Croatian Parliament by term
2000s in Croatia